Plaistow was a borough constituency returning a single Member of Parliament to the House of Commons of the Parliament of the United Kingdom through the first-past-the-post voting system. The constituency was one of four divisions of the Parliamentary Borough of West Ham, which had at the time the same boundaries as the County Borough of West Ham. Although administratively separate since 1889, the area was formally part of the county of Essex; since 1965 it has been part of the London Borough of Newham in Greater London.

The creation of the constituency was recommended by the Boundary Commission in a report issued in 1917, and formally created by the Representation of the People Act 1918. It came into existence at the 1918 general election. Its first member was Labour's Will(iam) Thorne who won with an impressive 94.9% of the popular vote, a record for an English parliamentary seat held to this day. As the borough of West Ham had only 120,586 electors on 15 October 1946, the relevant date for the subsequent Boundary Commission review, the borough was only entitled to two Members of Parliament; North and South divisions were recommended. As a consequence Plaistow was abolished as a separate constituency by the Representation of the People Act 1948 and went out of existence at the 1950 general election.

Boundaries
Plaistow was based on Plaistow and Hudsons wards of the County Borough of West Ham. The large wards in the southern County Borough of West Ham at the time of the 1917 Boundary Commission review made it necessary to split one ward across two constituencies, or else the divisions of West Ham would have had significantly different sizes. The ward which was split was the Canning Town ward, with the northern and western part of the ward included in Plaistow: the commissioners drew a line along the centre of the Woolwich branch of the Great Eastern Railway (now the North London Line) from Canning Town station north to join up with Star Lane (near the future Star Lane DLR station), then east along Star Lane, to join up with the ward boundary at Hermit Lane and Beckton Road.

In 1950 the territory of this division was transferred to form part of the West Ham South constituency.

Members of Parliament

Elections

Elections in the 1910s

Elections in the 1920s

Elections in the 1930s 

General Election 1939–40

Another General Election was required to take place before the end of 1940. The political parties had been making preparations for an election to take place and by the Autumn of 1939, the following candidates had been selected; 
Labour: Will Thorne
Conservative:

Elections in the 1940s

References

Bibliography
 Boundaries of Parliamentary Constituencies 1885-1972, compiled and edited by F.W.S. Craig (Parliamentary Reference Publications 1972)

Parliamentary constituencies in London (historic)
Constituencies of the Parliament of the United Kingdom established in 1918
Constituencies of the Parliament of the United Kingdom disestablished in 1950
Politics of the London Borough of Newham
Plaistow, Newham